was a Japanese professional sumo wrestler from Musha District, Kazusa Province. He was the sport's 17th yokozuna.

Early life and career
He was the son of a former ōzeki named  who wanted his son to become a rikishi. His father asked professional wrestler , who had come to Sakura on a tour in 1881, to initiate his son into the sport in Takasago stable. At first, Iwai was unable to endure the rigorous training and ran away to his parents' house a couple of times, but with his father's encouragement, he decided to rejoin in 1883 and took up the name . Konishiki earned the nickname of "Kurueru shirozō" (狂える白象, 'raging white elephant') because of his soft, fair-skinned body and ability to get off his feet. He was very popular for his white body, gentle and pretty appearance, and warmth and innocence. He was also a popular figure in the sumo world because of his low profile, honesty, earnestness and his work ethic.

Yokozuna
When he received his yokozuna license from the  after the May 1896 tournament, he was the first yokozuna in history to receive the license when he was in his 20s, but he was already past his prime and never won a single championship when competing at this rank. It is said that his results were so weak because, around the time of his promotion to yokozuna, his stablemaster (former sekiwake ) suffered an illness, and so Konishiki took care of him. In spite of his amazing debut, he did not have the best record in any tournaments as yokozuna. On April 8, 1900, his stablemaster died. Konishiki was absent from the next tournament and retired in January 1901. In the top makuuchi division, he won 119 bouts and lost 24 bouts, recording a winning percentage of 83.2.

Retirement from sumo and death
Konishiki stayed in the Tokyo Sumo Association as an elder under the name of Hatachiyama (二十山). Konishiki's great hobby was reading novels and he continued to have a good relationship with the younger wrestlers who replaced him at the top of sumo. Among others, yokozuna Umegatani Tōtarō I  and ōzeki Araiwa Kamenosuke would come to listen to him read.
Konishiki died on October 22, 1914 at 47. He died just before being officially granted the name "Takasago". As the title was posthumously awarded, he is not counted in the list of Takasago elders. After his death, the Takasago name was succeeded by Asashio Tarō II, who became the stable head coach.

Homage
The Konishiki shikona is considered a prestigious legacy in Takasago stable. The name is traditionally betowed to promising wrestlers. Hawaiian-born ōzeki Konishiki Yasokichi was named after him but is actually the 6th generation Konishiki. In total, three wrestlers named Konishiki have been promoted to the top makuuchi division.

Fighting style
Konishiki made up for his lack of physical strength with intense training. He was famous for his tachi-ai, attacking so quickly he had already started the match before the gyōji had the time to finish saying "hakkeyoi". He was good at pushing through and was known as a versatile fighter who could strike, hang, throw, and twist. In addition his style was a combination of fierce and agile wrestling.

Top division record

  
    
    
  
  
    
    
  
  
    
    
  
  
    
    
  
  
    
    
  
  
    
    
  
  
    
    
  
  
    
    
  
  
    
    
  
  
    
    
  
  
    
    
  
  
    
    
  
  
    
    
  
  
    
  

*Championships for the best record in a tournament were not recognized or awarded before the 1909 summer tournament and the above unofficial championships are historically conferred. For more information see yūshō.

See also

Glossary of sumo terms
List of past sumo wrestlers
List of yokozuna

References

1866 births
1914 deaths
Japanese sumo wrestlers
Yokozuna
Sumo people from Chiba Prefecture
19th-century wrestlers